Pierre Duprat (born 26 November 1989 in Agen) is a French judoka. He competed at the 2016 Summer Olympics in the men's 73 kg event, in which he was eliminated in the second round by Denis Iartcev.

References

External links
 
 
 
 

Sportspeople from Agen
1989 births
Living people
French male judoka
Olympic judoka of France
Judoka at the 2016 Summer Olympics
European Games competitors for France
Judoka at the 2015 European Games
20th-century French people
21st-century French people